Acid Bath was an American sludge metal band from Houma, Louisiana, active from 1991 to 1997. Acid Bath combined doom metal roots with influences from hardcore punk, death metal, gothic rock, and blues to create the band's unique sound. They broke up after the death of bassist Audie Pitre in a traffic collision in January 1997.

History 
Acid Bath was an incarnation of two bands, Dark Karnival which featured Audie Pitre, Sammy "Pierre" Duet, and Tommy Viator, and Golgotha which featured Dax Riggs, Mike Sanchez, Jimmy Kyle, and Jerry "Boon" Businelli. Golgotha's bassists were in frequent rotation finally culminating with Chad Pierce, who would then be succeeded by Pitre during Acid Bath's formation. Tommy Viator was later replaced by Jimmy Kyle on drums but would return to play keyboards toward the end of the band's career. Joseph J. Fontenot was the bassist for a short period of time.

Acid Bath formed in 1991. The band was based south of New Orleans in several small towns including Houma, Thibodaux, Morgan City and Galliano. Influenced by thrash metal as well as bands and artists such as Black Sabbath, Alice Cooper, Celtic Frost, Carcass and Darkthrone, they recorded their demo Hymns of the Needle Freak with their manager and producer Keith Falgout in 1993. The strength of the demo earned them a deal with Rotten Records, an independent label. They released When the Kite String Pops produced by Spike Cassidy in 1994, followed two years later by their second and final effort Paegan Terrorism Tactics (also produced by Keith Falgout). Neither gained them mainstream success, but both albums earned a high degree of underground acclaim. In 2005, another album composed of their demos, Demos: 1993–1996, was released.

Break-up and subsequent projects 
After two studio albums, Acid Bath's career came to an abrupt end on January 23, 1997, when bass guitarist Audie Pitre and his parents were killed by a drunk driver who had run a stop sign. Kelly Pitre, Audie's brother, was the only one of four family members to survive the incident, escaping with only a broken rib and a mild neck fracture.

While rumors of another album circulated after the band's end, nothing new surfaced. Sammy Duet owns a tape of he and Mike Sanchez coming up with riffs for a possible third Acid Bath album. He mentioned this tape on his interview with Does It Doom?. The tape was labeled "Rat Poison" because neither of them could come up with an album name. One of the members saw some rat poison in a box at the rehearsal space and said "just call it fucking Rat Poison". It was also rumored that some of the riffs were used for the first Goatwhore album; however, this was proven to be false.

Tommy Viator played drums on Disincarnate's album Dreams of the Carrion Kind with the well-known death metal guitarist James Murphy. Dax Riggs and Mike Sanchez went on to perform in the band Agents of Oblivion, releasing one self-titled album in 2000 and disbanding shortly thereafter. Starting in 2000, Riggs was also the frontman for the swamp rock band Deadboy & the Elephantmen, before he began releasing material under his own name in 2007. Sammy Pierre Duet was once a member of Crowbar, but has since left the band. He is now a member of the blackened death metal band Goatwhore and Ritual Killer and his doom metal band with Kelly Pitre (the brother of Audie) Vual. Sammy Duet has remained an open satanist since his days in Acid Bath. Audie formed a metal band in 1995, blending black metal vocals with the heavy sound of multiple bassists with no guitars, known as Shrüm. Tommy Viator and Joseph Fontenot were also members of Shrüm. Shrüm utilized two distorted low-end basses, and Fontenot would alternate between playing a distorted high-end bass and a clean bass. Fontenot later played bass for Devourment for two years. Joseph Fontenot is now a drill sergeant in the U.S. Army.

In 2014, rumors started that Acid Bath were reuniting with a new vocalist because Jimmy Kyle reached out to vocalist of Slipknot Corey Taylor with a very vague message stating "Acid Bath is in search of a vocalist. Please send Mp3, demo, videos or any music links performing Acid Bath songs." However, these rumors were dismissed by other band members stating that "There is no ACID BATH without [late bassist] Audie Pitre, so there will never be 'new' ACID BATH material", and that "Currently, most of the surviving members of ACID BATH — Jimmy, Mike, and myself — have been considering the possibility of doing some shows in the future, as an ACID BATH tribute band, but nothing has been set in stone, and it is still just an idea."

Musical style 

Acid Bath is best known for blending extreme, death metal-influenced sludge metal with a mixture of death growls and melancholic goth/grunge-style vocals and acoustic guitar passages, as well as use of sampling and spoken word poetry. AllMusic has called the band's sound "difficult to pigeonhole" and described it as "a blend of Black Sabbath-like sludge, bluesy Southern rock, death metal, hardcore, and hints of goth and industrial".  In a Pit Magazine interview, vocalist Dax Riggs classified their sound as "death rock". In another interview, guitarist Sammy Duet described their sound as "gothic hardcore".

The band sampled sound clips from controversial movies including Blue Velvet and A Clockwork Orange. Dax Riggs' vocals were processed, which produced an industrial feel; some other instruments have been processed through industrial effects in their recordings (such as the snare drum on the second half of "New Death Sensation"). One of Acid Bath's most trademark sounds was the way in which they crafted multiple tempo changes and worked them into the song structure. Their experimentation drifted into diverse territory. The song "Scream of the Butterfly" is an acoustic blues song with the drummer with double bass drum patterns toward the end of the song. The song "The Bones of Baby Dolls" experiments with folk musicianship, and the song "Dead Girl" was described as a country song by Dax Riggs.

Dax Riggs' lyrics are frequently poetic, often displaying an obsession with death, drug use, mental illness, dark humor, Louisiana-based regional culture, and continuous references to animism as well as paganism, nihilism, and misanthropy. He has claimed these inspirations are culled from comic books, namely those authored by Frank Miller, Alan Moore, and Clive Barker, and has also expressed admiration for ANSWER Me! and Boiled Angel. AllMusic's William York has stated that the song "Venus Blue" could have been a radio hit "if not for the graphic lyrics". Another facet of their presentation which may not have endeared them to popular sentiment was the use of art by John Wayne Gacy and Dr. Jack Kevorkian. Due to the controversy surrounding Kevorkian's artwork For He Is Raised on the album, Paegan Terrorism Tactics was initially banned from Australia. The ban has since been lifted. The cover of the band's 1994 extended play simply entitled Edits featured the artwork of Richard Ramirez. The cover of their 1996 compilation entitled Radio Edits featured the artwork of Kenneth Bianchi. Their song "Diäb Soulé" ("Drunken Devil" in Cajun-French) starts out with an audio sample of Jim Jones of the People's Temple screaming. Their song "Toubabo Koomi" is Cajun-French for the "Land of White Cannibals".

Members

Final lineup 
 Sammy Pierre Duet – guitars, vocals (1991–1997)
 Jimmy Kyle – drums (1991–1997)
 Audie Pitre – bass guitar, backing vocals (1991–1997; died 1997)
 Dax Riggs – vocals (1991–1997)
 Mike Sanchez – guitars, vocals (1991–1997)
 Joseph Fontenot – bass guitar (1991–1992, 1997)
 Tomas Viator – keyboards (1996–1997)

Discography

Studio albums 
 When the Kite String Pops (1994)
 Paegan Terrorism Tactics (1996)

Demos 
 Wet Dreams of the Insane (Golgotha demo) (1991)
 Screams of the Butterfly (1992)
 Demo II (1993)
 Hymns of the Needle Freak (1993)
 Liquid Death Bootleg (1993)
 Radio Edits 1 (1994)
 Radio Edits 2 (1996)
 Paegan Terrorism Tactics Outtakes (1996)
 Demos: 1993–1996 (2005)

Videos 
 "Apocalyptic Sunshine Bootleg" (1994)
 "Toubabo Koomi" (1994)
 "Double Live Bootleg!" DVD (2002)

References

External links 
 

American sludge metal musical groups
Heavy metal musical groups from Louisiana
Musical groups established in 1991
Musical groups disestablished in 1997
Musical quartets
1991 establishments in Louisiana